Wally Fielding (26 November 1919 – 18 January 2008) was a professional footballer from 1945 until 1960.

In 1945, after leaving the Army, Fielding was signed by Everton manager Theo Kelly having been a youth amateur player for Charlton Athletic

Known for his passing precision, reading of the game and his ability to beat defenders he was the start of many an Everton attack. His trademark he became known for was laying in a perfectly weighted ball inside the full back to his flying winger Tommy Eglington. In his Everton career, he played 410 first-team games and scored 54 times.

In 1959, at the age of 39, he left for Southport, playing 20 games for the seaside club and scoring one goal.

Following retirement, Fielding settled in Cornwall. He died at his home there on 18 January 2008. He had been Everton's oldest living former player at the time.

References

1919 births
2008 deaths
English footballers
Everton F.C. players
Southport F.C. players
Footballers from Edmonton, London
Watford F.C. non-playing staff
English football managers
Southport F.C. managers
Association football inside forwards
British Army personnel of World War II